The following lists events that have happened in 1898 in the Qajar dynasty, Iran.

Incumbents
 Monarch: Mozaffar al-Din Shah Qajar

Birth
 January 21 – Ahmad Shah Qajar the last king of Qajar was born in Tabriz (d. 1930 in France)

References

 
Iran
Years of the 19th century in Iran
1890s in Iran
Iran